2020 Belarusian Second League is the 30th season of 3rd tier football in Belarus. It started in April and will finish in November 2020.

Group A

League table

Results

Group B

League table

Results

Promotion group

External link
 Official site 

Belarusian Second League
3
Belarus
Belarus